Gorebal is a village located 9 km from Sindhanur in the Raichur district of Karnataka state, India. Gorebal is well irrigated with Tunga Bhadra left bank canals 32 (Hanchinal camp) and 36 (Gorebal camp).

Population
The population is around 20,000 in Gorebal including Ambamath cross.

Temples
The Shree Sharanabasaveshwara temple on the bank of Tungabhadra halla (a kind of small river) is a holy place in Gorebal. Shree Sharanabasaveshwara Jatra is held in March every year and is well known around Raichur, Koppal and Bellary districts.

Shree Sharanabasaveshwara
Shree Channabasaveshwara
Shree Eeshwara
Shree Devi
Shree Anjaneya.

Transportation
Gorebal is situated on the Hubli-Raichur main road, SH-23. Buses from Sindhanur to Gangavati provide transportation. Gorebal is 400 km from Bangalore and 300 km from Hyderabad.

Education
GMPS
Government High School

References

Villages in Raichur district